Bengaluru North University (BNU) is a state university located in Tamaka, near NH 75 in Kolar, Karnataka, India. The university was established in 2017 by the Government of Karnataka through the Karnataka  State Universities (Amendment) Act, 2015 trifurcating Bangalore University by creating Bengaluru North University and Bengaluru Central University (later Bengaluru City University).

History
Dr. Venugopal K R, UVCE Alumni, Principal UVCE was the Special Officer   to the Government of Karnataka for Trifurcating Bangalore University which had over 600 affiliated colleges. He submitted the report on 26th March 2015 for restructuring Bangalore University into Bangalore University, Bengaluru City University and Bengaluru North University. In 2012, C. T. Ravi, the Minister For Higher Education, Government of Karnataka, announced plans to bifurcate 300 colleges out of the university by creating Bengaluru North University. Requests to following the original recommendation or even create four universities were made. In May 2015 the government announced it will follow the original recommendation and create Bengaluru North University and Bengaluru Central University, with about 200 colleges assigned to each of them. The Bill was passed in July 2015 and the university was inaugurated on 21 September 2017 and T. D. Kemparaju was appointed Vice-Chancellor (VC). Niranjan Vanalli was appointed VC in November 2021.

Academics
The university has 210 affiliated colleges. Affiliation to the three universities is based on Karnataka Legislative Assembly constituencies. BNU affiliating all colleges under Srinivaspur, Mulbagal, KGF, Bangarpet, Kolar and Malur Assembly constituencies in Kolar district; K R Puram, Pulikeshinagar, Sarvagnanagar, C V Raman Nagar and Mahadevapura Assembly constituencies in Bengaluru Urban district; Gauribidanur, Bagepalli, Chikkaballapur, Sidlaghatta and Chintamani Assembly constituencies in Chikkaballapur district; Devanahalli, Doddaballapur and Hoskote Assembly constituencies in Bengaluru Rural district.

Campus
The university will operate for academic year 2017–18 from temporary offices in the campus of Karnataka State Open University at Tamaka on the outskirts of Kolar. A permanent campus will be constructed at Amaravathi village in Chickballapur district.

References

External links
 

Universities and colleges in Kolar district
Universities in Karnataka
Educational institutions established in 2017
2017 establishments in Karnataka